Euxoa fissa is a moth of the family Noctuidae. It is found in Siberia (the West Siberian Plain and the South Siberian Mountains), Armenia, Kyrghyzstan and Mongolia.

External links
Noctuinae (Noctuidae) collection of Siberian Zoological Museum

Euxoa
Moths described in 1895